π Lupi (Latinised to Pi Lupi) is a multiple star system in the southern constellation Lupus. Two components form a wide binary pair with an orbital period of 517 years and a semimajor axis of 1.59″.  They belong to the Upper Centaurus Lupus component of the Sco–Cen complex.

At least one of the components is a spectroscopic binary and produces eclipses 15.5 days apart, making it an eclipsing binary.  There are also other brightness variations with a period of 16 hours that are likely to be pulsations of the Slowly pulsating B-type star.  The eclipses are shallow, with the brightness dropping by only 1% or about 0.01 magnitudes.  The amplitude of the pulsations is even smaller.

π Lupi A (HR 5605, HD 133242) has been classified as a spectroscopic binary by at least two studies, but both components may be spectroscopic binaries.

References

Lupus (constellation)
Lupi, Pi
133242/3
Eclipsing binaries
5605 6
073807
Durchmusterung objects
B-type main-sequence stars
B-type subgiants
Upper Centaurus Lupus